Thoresway is a village and civil parish in the West Lindsey district of Lincolnshire, England. The population (including Kirmond le Mire and Stainton le Vale) was 198 at the 2011 census.

Thoresway is recorded in Domesday Book as "Toreswe", and listed as having 62 households and two mills.  In an 1187 Gilbertine charter it was listed as "Toresweie". The name may derive from:-
 Old Norse Þórirs vegr = "way of a Viking called Thórir", or
 Old Norse Þórs væ = "temple of the god Thor".

The parish church is a Grade II listed building dedicated to Saint Mary and dating from the 12th century, although it was largely rebuilt between 1879 and 1886 by James Fowler of Louth. It was built of ironstone and limestone and has a 12th-century font.

Also in the village is a Grade II listed watermill dating from 1816.

References

External links

Villages in Lincolnshire
Civil parishes in Lincolnshire
West Lindsey District